Globalcell Mobile was a mobile virtual network operator (MVNO) was based in the UK and was established in late 2008.

The service offered customers a SIM-only pre-paid service with all customer interaction conducted in the customers' native language, which includes Polish, Russian, Lithuanian, Slovak and English.

Their customer base were predominantly Poles, Lithuanians, Russians and Slovaks living in the UK but also cater for the UK’s immigrant and ethnic population that are looking to call internationally.

Globalcell mobile offered an alternative to calling cards, dual SIM cards and access numbers. The pre-paid SIM not only offered competitive rates to call internationally and low cost rates within the UK for Pay as you go customers not wanting to be tied down by a mobile phone contract.

They are able to do this due to buying capacity in bulk from a much larger UK network.

GloballCell (UK) ceased trading as of 28 November 2010.

References

External links
 Globalcell Mobile's website

Mobile virtual network operators